The 2022 Princeton Tigers football team represented Princeton University  as a member of the Ivy League during the 2022 NCAA Division I FCS football season. The team was led by 12th-year head coach Bob Surace and played its home games at Powers Field at Princeton Stadium.

Previous season

The Tigers finished the 2021 season with a record of 9–1, 6–1 Ivy League play to win the Ivy championship with Dartmouth.

Schedule

Game summaries

at Stetson

Lehigh

at Columbia

at Lafayette

Brown

at Harvard

Cornell

Dartmouth

at Yale

Penn

References

Princeton
Princeton Tigers football seasons
Princeton Tigers football